Clifton was a community in Allouez Township, Keweenaw County, Michigan, that was founded in support of the Cliff mine—a mine opened in 1845 by the Pittsburgh and Boston Mining Company after copper was discovered there. It is located between Calumet and Eagle Harbor, off of Cliff Drive, alongside US 41 in the Keweenaw Peninsula. A historical marker is present at the site.

Mining was the main source of employment, drawing men of different nationalities, including Irish, German, French Canadians, and Cornish men.  Clifton had only a few churches, including Catholic and Episcopal.  Their masses were spoken in many different languages, including English, French and German.  Along with religious groups, there were also organizational groups: The Independent Order of Good Templars, the Band of Hope, and the Independent Order of Odd Fellows.

At one point, the town supported an independent brewery called the Clifton Bottling Works.

After the Cliff mine exhausted the copper deposit, the town became deserted.

Two cemeteries remain. One is at the base of the cliff by the mine. This is the original cemetery. The second was established when the railroad came through and the town was moved to be closer to the tracks, about a half mile east of the mine.

Further reading

Former populated places in Keweenaw County, Michigan
Ghost towns in Michigan
Mining communities in Michigan
Company towns in Michigan